Gabara distema is a species of moth in the family Erebidae. The species is endemic to North America, specifically the states of Texas, Arizona, North Carolina and Florida.

The larvae probably feed on wiregrass.

External links
Species info
Images
Bug Guide

Scolecocampinae